was a protected cruiser in the Imperial Japanese Navy, acquired as a prize of war during the Russo-Japanese War from the Imperial Russian Navy, where it had been known as .

Background
Varyag was built in the United States by William Cramp & Sons of Philadelphia for the Imperial Russian Navy. It was stationed in Korea in 1904, and involved in the opening Battle of Chemulpo Bay of the Russo-Japanese War. After suffering heavy damage from the unequal battle with nine Japanese cruisers, Varyag was scuttled by its crew on 9 February 1904.

After the Russo-Japanese War, the Japanese raised the badly damaged wreck from Chemulpo harbor, repaired it, and commissioned it into the Imperial Japanese Navy as the 2nd class cruiser Soya on 9 July 1907. Its new name was taken from the northernmost cape of Hokkaidō, Soya Misaki.

Service life

After being placed into Japanese service as a 3rd class cruiser, Soya was used primarily for training duties. From 14 March 1909 to 7 August 1909, it made a long distance navigational and officer cadet training cruise to Hawaii and North America. It repeated this training cruise every year until 1913.

During World War I Russia and Japan became allies and Soya (along with several other vessels) was transferred back to Russia at Vladivostok on 5 April 1916, and its original name of Varyag restored.

Gallery

References
 Evans, David. Kaigun: Strategy, Tactics, and Technology in the Imperial Japanese Navy, 1887-1941. US Naval Institute Press (1979). 
 Howarth, Stephen.  The Fighting Ships of the Rising Sun: The Drama of the Imperial Japanese Navy, 1895-1945. Atheneum; (1983) 
 Jentsura, Hansgeorg. Warships of the Imperial Japanese Navy, 1869-1945. Naval Institute Press (1976).

External link

Cruisers of the Imperial Japanese Navy
1900 ships
Russo-Japanese War cruisers of Japan
World War I cruisers of Japan
World War I cruisers of Russia
Ships built by William Cramp & Sons